Renee Merrifield is a Canadian politician, who was elected to the Legislative Assembly of British Columbia in the 2020 British Columbia general election. She represents the electoral district of Kelowna-Mission as a member of the British Columbia Liberal Party. She serves as the Official Opposition Critic for Environment & Climate Change.

Merrifield ran in the 2022 British Columbia Liberal Party leadership election. She placed sixth, and was eliminated on the second ballot. Kevin Falcon went on to win the election on the fifth ballot, and become the party's leader.

Electoral Record

References

21st-century Canadian politicians
21st-century Canadian women politicians
British Columbia Liberal Party MLAs
Conservative Party of Canada politicians
Women MLAs in British Columbia
People from Kelowna
Living people
Year of birth missing (living people)